Termessa gratiosa is a moth in the subfamily Arctiinae. It was described by Francis Walker in 1865. It is found in Australia, where it has been recorded from the Australian Capital Territory, New South Wales, Queensland and Victoria.

The wingspan is about 20 mm. The forewings are white with black zig-zag bands. The hindwings are yellow with a dark brown arc at the termen and a dark brown spot on the tornus.

The larvae feed on lichens.

References

Moths described in 1865
Lithosiini